Kaunas University of Technology (abbreviated as KTU) is a public research university located in Kaunas, Lithuania. Established in 1922, KTU has been one of the top centers of Lithuanian science education. According to Lithuanian Nathe tional University Rankings conducted in 2021, KTU was the second-best university in Lithuania. The primary language of education is Lithuanian, although there are courses that are taught jointly in Lithuanian and English or solely English.

History

Early years
The origins of KTU are in the University of Lithuania established on 16 February 1922. On 8 June 1930 the university was named Vytautas Magnus University. The university then consisted of seven faculties consisting of the Faculty of Theology and Philosophy, Faculty of Evangelical Theology, Faculty of Humanities, Faculty of Law, Faculty of Mathematics and Natural Sciences, Faculty of Medicine and Faculty of Technology. The beginning of 1940 saw the reorganisation of Vytautas Magnus University with The Faculties of Law and Humanities being transferred to the University of Vilnius.

World War II and the Soviet era
On 21 August 1940, following the Soviet occupation, the university was renamed to the University of Kaunas. In the autumn of 1940 the Faculty of Mathematics and Natural Sciences was transferred to the University of Vilnius. After the German occupation in 1941, the university was once again renamed to Vytautas Magnus University with five faculties: Theology, Philosophy, Technology, Civil Engineering and Mathematics. On 17 March 1943, the university was closed.

On 13 November 1944, the Soviet government reopened the university and, until 1946, it operated under the name of Kaunas National Vytautas Magnus University. In June 1949 the Faculty of History and Theology was closed. In 1950 the University of Kaunas was reorganised into Kaunas Polytechnic Institute (KPI) and Kaunas Medical Institute. Throughout the Soviet era, the KPI resisted Russification and, in particular, kept teaching in the Lithuanian language.

Under the influence of Perestroika, the government of Lithuanian SSR reinstated the school's university status. In 1989, Vytautas Magnus University was re-established as a separate university from KPI. In 1990, KPI renamed to its current name of Kaunas University of Technology.

Since 1990
Following the restoration of independence, the institution rapidly adopted the Western standards. In 1992, the university, in accordance with the Law on Science and Education, started implementing a two-level degree program of higher education and a new procedure of awarding research degrees and academic titles. In 1998, the university joined Magna Charta of the European Universities and became a member of the European University Association and the International Association of Universities.

Education 

Kaunas University of Technology has 122 study programmes, of which 48 are bachelor's, 54 are master's, 19 are doctoral and 1 is a non-degree student programme. Of the 122 offered programmes, 56 are taught in English. The university has more than 9,000 students, of which more than 6,600 are bachelor's, 2,000 are master's and 320 are doctoral students. Approximately 6.5 per cent of the student population is foreign. All of that fits into nine faculties of KTU. KTU also engages in research of physical, technological and social sciences, and experimental development, while research of biomedical sciences and humanities is also promoted. All of that fits into eight research institutes of KTU.

Institutes 

 Biomedical Engineering Institute 
 Institute of Aviation & Aeronautical
 Food Institute 
 Institute of Architecture and Construction 
 Institute of Environmental Engineering 
 Institute of Materials Science 
 Institute of Mechatronics
 Kazimieras Baršauskas Ultrasound Research Institute
 Health Telematics Science Institute

Education in English 
The following programs are offered entirely in English for bachelors and masters levels.

Bachelor's level programs 

Faculty of Chemical Technology
Chemical Technology and Engineering 
Food Science and Technology 
 School of Economics and Business
 Business Digitalization Management
 Faculty of Electrical and Electronics Engineering
 Electronic and Electrical Engineering
 Intelligent Robotics Systems
 Renewable Energy Engineering
 Faculty of Informatics
 Artificial Intelligence
 Informatics
 Faculty of Mathematics and Natural Sciences
 Materials Physics and Nanotechnologies
 Faculty of Mechanical Engineering and Design
 Aviation Engineering
 Mechanical Engineering
 Mechatronics
 Vehicle Engineering
 Faculty of Social Sciences, Arts and Humanities
 Communication Studies and Information Management Technologies
 New Media Language
 Public Governance and Civil Society
 Faculty of Civil Engineering and Architecture
 Architecture
 Civil Engineering

Master's level programs 

 Faculty of Chemical Technology
 Applied Chemistry 
 Chemical Engineering 
 Environmental Engineering 
 Food Science and Safety 
 Industrial Biotechnlogy 
 School of Economics and Business
 Accounting and Auditing
 International Business
 Faculty of Electrical and Electronics Engineering
 Biomedical Engineering
 Control Technologies
 Electronics Engineering
 Energy Technologies and Economics
 Faculty of Informatics
 Artificial Intelligence in Computer Science
 Faculty of Mathematics and Natural Sciences
 Materials Physics
 Medical Physics
 Faculty of Mechanical Engineering and Design
 Aeronautical Engineering
 Industrial Engineering and Management
 Mechanical Engineering
 Mechatronics
 Sustainable Management and Production
 Vehicle Engineering
 Faculty of Social Sciences, Arts and Humanities
 Public Policy and Security
 Translation and Localization of Technical Texts
 Faculty of Civil Engineering and Architecture
 Architecture
 Structural and Building Products Engineering
 Panevėžys Faculty of Technologies and Business
 Control Technologies

Events
In 1998 the KTU Regional Business Incubator was established. It is the first technological business incubator in Lithuania, providing support to enterprises interested in starting new businesses.
In 2008, Rymantas Jonas Kažys was awarded with the National Award for Partnership Advancement for creating technologies of supersonic measurement and diagnostics and for the commencement of European scientific research and practice. 
In 2010, Jurgis Kazimieras Staniškis, head of the Institute of Environmental Engineering, was awarded the Baltic Sea Award 2010.  Staniškis is currently the only Lithuanian scientist to receive this award.
In 2010 an agreement on the Integrated Science, Studies and Business Center (Valley) of Santaka sponsorship of the first investment project was signed. The implementation of this project will result in the establishment of a world-class National open-access R&D Center within the KTU Student Campus in Kaunas. The center will primarily focus in such areas as sustainable chemistry, mechatronics, information and communication technology, and sustainable energy resources, which are a substantial part of the Lithuanian economy and comprise a significant part of its export.
On the 13 October 2017, Klaus Schwab, head of the World Economic Forum, became the 45th Honorary Doctor of Kaunas University of Technology for "spreading the knowledge on economy and innovative ideas, for fostering social entrepreneurship and support for young businesses, and for his contribution into developing the concept of the Fourth Industrial Revolution".

References

External links

 Official website of Kaunas University of Technology 

 
Universities and colleges in Kaunas
Architecture schools
Technical universities and colleges in Lithuania
Science and technology in Lithuania
Scientific organizations based in Lithuania
Educational institutions established in 1922
Universities and colleges in Lithuania
Universities in Lithuania
1922 establishments in Lithuania